The 1949 California Golden Bears football team was an American football team that represented the University of California, Berkeley in the Pacific Coast Conference (PCC) during the 1949 college football season. In their third year under head coach Pappy Waldorf, the team compiled a 10–1 record (7–0 against PCC opponents), won the PCC championship, lost to Ohio State in the Rose Bowl, and outscored its opponents by a combined total of 319 to 131.

California was ranked third in the final AP Poll, released in late November.

Schedule

References

California
California Golden Bears football seasons
Pac-12 Conference football champion seasons
California Golden Bears football